The Beacon may refer to:

Film and television
 The Beacon (film), a 2009 American horror film
 "The Beacon" (The Twilight Zone), an episode of the TV series

Literature
 The Beacon (novel), by Susan Hill, 2008

Media

Newspapers
 The Beacon (Florida International University), a student newspaper
 The Beacon (University of Portland), a student newspaper
 The Beacon (Kansas City), online newspaper focusing on investigative journalism in Kansas City
 The Beacon, a student newspaper at Woodrow Wilson High School (Washington, D.C.)
 The Beacon, a diocesan newspaper published by the Roman Catholic Diocese of Paterson

Magazine
 The Beacon, a magazine published by Breast Cancer Network Australia
 The Beacon, an alumni magazine published by Bushnell University
 The Beacon, a magazine published by the Lucis Trust
 The Beacon, literary magazine published monthly in Trinidad between 1931 and 1933

Newsletters 

 The Beacon, a quarterly newsletter published by Friedman Place

Places and buildings
 The Beacon (Cleveland), Ohio, U.S., a residential tower in 
 The Beacon, Cornwall, England, a hill 
 The Beacon (Eastham, Massachusetts), U.S., a historic lighthouse
 The Beacon, Hemel Hempstead, Hertfordshire, England, a residential tower
 The Beacon Jersey City, New Jersey, U.S., a restoration of former Jersey City Medical Center

See also

Beacon (disambiguation)
 Al-Manar ('The Beacon'), a Lebanese satellite television station